Daegu Haany University is a South Korean university specialized in providing training for practitioners of Oriental medicine.  The main campus is located a short distance outside Daegu in Gyeongsan City, North Gyeongsang province.  Another campus, along with the university hospital, operates within Daegu.  The current president is  Joon-Koo Lee, who has served since 2010.

Academics

Although continuing the university's traditional focus on Traditional Korean Medicine, the current academic offerings cover a wide range of fields, such as child welfare, tourism, and police administration.  The undergraduate courses are offered through the university's five colleges:  Traditional Korean Medicine, Health and Welfare, Cultural Sciences, Business and Information, and Architecture and Design.

History

The university opened its doors as a college in 1981.  The affiliated hospital was opened in 1983.  The college gained university status in 1992 and took on the name "Kyungsan University" (경산대학교).  In 2003 the current name was adopted.

Sister schools

Daegu Haany University maintains international exchange relationships with institutions in six countries:  the United States (Cal Poly, Fairleigh Dickinson University, Eastern Kentucky University, University of Georgia), Thailand (Phon Commercial and Technical College), Kazakhstan (Al-Farabi University), Taiwan Chinese Medical School of Taiwan), China (Beijing University of Chinese Medicine, Hebei Chinese Medical School, Tianjin Chinese Medical School, Yonyung Chinese Medical School), and Australia (Macquarie University).

See also
List of colleges and universities in South Korea
Education in South Korea

External links
Official school website

Universities and colleges in North Gyeongsang Province
Universities and colleges in Daegu
Traditional Korean medicine
1981 establishments in South Korea
Educational institutions established in 1981